Mark William O'Connell (born June 25, 1964) is a Canadian-born American prelate of the Roman Catholic Church. He has been serving as an auxiliary bishop of the Archdiocese of Boston in Massachusetts since 2016. He has been the vicar general and moderator of the curia of the archdiocese since 2023.

Biography

Early life 
Mark O'Connell was born in Toronto, Ontario on June 25, 1964 to Thomas F. and Margaret M. (Delaney) O'Connell, both American citizens. His father Thomas was the head librarian at York University in Toronto and later at Boston College in Boston, Massachusetts The family returned to Massachusetts when Mark O'Connell was age 12. He graduated from Dover-Sherborn High School in Dover, Massachusetts, in 1982.

O'Connell earned a Bachelor of Arts degree in English and philosophy at Boston College in 1986 and studied for the priesthood at Saint John's Seminary in Boston.

Priesthood 
O'Connell was ordained into the priesthood by Cardinal Bernard Law for the Archdiocese of Boston on June 16, 1990.  After his ordination, O'Connell served in parishes in Woburn and Danvers and as a college chaplain at Salem State College, all in Massachusetts. 

O'Connell undertook studies in canon law starting in 1997 at the Pontifical Athenaeum of the Holy Cross in Rome, completing his licentiate degree in 1999 and his doctorate in 2002.  O'Connell's dissertation was titled The Mobility of Secular Clerics and Incardination. After returning to Boston, he joined the canonical affairs staff of the archdiocese in 2001 and was appointed judicial vicar in 2007, a position he held until 2018.

From 2009 to 2012, O'Connell served as a senior consultor to the Canon Law Society of America. He has also served on the faculty of Saint John's Seminary and Pope St. John XXIII National Seminary in Weston, Massachusetts. From 2011 to 2014, O'Connell was a co-host on the daily radio program The Good Catholic Life, broadcast on radio station WQOM in Boston.

Auxiliary Bishop of Boston
On June 3, 2016, Pope Francis appointed O'Connell as an auxiliary bishop of the Archdiocese of Boston and titular bishop of Gigthi in Tripolitana. He was consecrated on August 24, 2016, at the Cathedral of the Holy Cross in Boston by Cardinal Seán O'Malley. 

As auxiliary bishop, O'Connell was assigned the north region of the archdiocese as well as pastor of St. Theresa Parish in North Reading, Massachusetts until December 31, 2022. Since January 1, 2023, he has served as vicar general and moderator of the curia of the archdiocese.

See also

 Catholic Church hierarchy
 Catholic Church in the United States
 Historical list of the Catholic bishops of the United States
 List of the Catholic bishops of the United States
 Lists of patriarchs, archbishops, and bishops

References

External links

Roman Catholic Archdiocese of Boston Official Site

 

1964 births
Living people
20th-century Roman Catholic bishops in the United States
Clergy from Toronto
Pontifical University of the Holy Cross alumni
Roman Catholic clergy from Boston
Bishops appointed by Pope Francis